The Tijani is a Sufi order.

Tijani may also refer to:

 Ahmad Tijani (born 1987), Nigerian footballer
 Tijani (given name), a masculine given name

See also

 Al-Tijani (disambiguation)
 Tidjani